Nicole Della Monica (born 3 June 1989) is a retired Italian pair skater.  With her former partner Matteo Guarise, she is a seven-time Italian national champion (2016–22) and has represented Italy at the 2014, 2018 and 2022 Winter Olympics.

With her previous partner Yannick Kocon, she was a two-time Italian national champion (2009, 2010) and competed at the 2010 Winter Olympics.

Career 
Della Monica competed as a single skater through the 2006–07 season and is the 2005 Italian national bronze medalist.

Partnership with Kocon
Della Monica started skating pairs in 2007 when she teamed up with Yannick Kocon, who was also a single skater until then. They are the 2009 and 2010 Italian national champions. They represented Italy at the 2010 Winter Olympics. Their partnership ended in January 2011 — Della Monica had a chronic inflammation in her left knee and her recovery time was uncertain.

Partnership with Guarise

2011–12 season
Della Monica teamed up with former World champion roller skater Matteo Guarise in late November 2011. They train mainly in Zanica. They withdrew after the short program from the 2012 Italian Championships. Della Monica/Guarise made their international debut at the 2012 Bavarian Open where they won the bronze medal. They were assigned to compete at the 2012 World Championships and finished fifteenth.

2012–13 season
Della Monica/Guarise placed ninth at the 2013 European Championships and then fourteenth at the 2013 World Championships, where Italy secured two berths for the 2014 Olympic pairs event. They also won bronze at the 2013 Winter Universiade.

2013–14 season
After taking silver at the 2014 Italian Championships, they placed eighth at the 2014 European Championships. Della Monica/Guarise were named along with Italian champions Stefania Berton / Ondrej Hotarek as Italy's pairs entries at the 2014 Winter Olympics in Sochi. Just before the event, Guarise tore the medial meniscus in his right knee. The pair finished sixteenth at the Olympics. He then underwent a knee operation and resumed training at the start of March.

2014–15 season
In the 2014–15 season, Della Monica/Guarise competed at two Grand Prix events, placing fifth at the 2014 Cup of China and sixth at the 2014 Trophée Éric Bompard. After finishing second to Valentina Marchei / Ondřej Hotárek at the Italian Championships, they came in sixth at the 2015 European Championships in Stockholm, Sweden and fourteenth at the 2015 World Championships in Shanghai, China.

2015–16 season
In the 2015–16 season, Della Monica/Guarise took the bronze medal at the 2015 Ice Challenge, their first ISU Challenger Series (CS) event. After finishing fifth at their sole GP event, the 2015 Trophée Éric Bompard, they appeared at two more CS events, winning silver at the Warsaw Cup and placing sixth at the 2015 Golden Spin of Zagreb. In December 2015, they won their first national title together, edging out Marchei/Hotárek.  They placed sixth at the 2016 European Championships, and then placed eleventh at the 2016 World Championships in Boston, United States.

2016–17 season
The 2016–17 season saw the duo win two Challenger events, the 2016 Lombardia Trophy and 2016 Golden Spin of Zagreb.  They placed sixth at the Skate Canada International and fifth at the Cup of China.  After their second national title, they placed eighth at the 2017 European Championships, and then placed thirteenth at the 2017 World Championships in Helsinki, Finland.

2017–18 season
Della Monica and her partner began the 2017–18 season with silver medals at Lombardia Trophy and Finlandia Trophy.  Competing again at the Cup of China, they placed fourth.  At the Internationaux de France, they placed third, winning their first Grand Prix bronze medal.  Della Monica pronounced herself "really happy with our performance."  Della Monica/Guarise won their third straight national title, followed by a sixth-place finish at Europeans.  Competing at their second Olympic Games in Pyeongchang, South Korea, they placed tenth.  The season concluded at the 2018 World Championships in Milan, where they placed fifth overall.

2018–19 season
Their 2018–19 season began again at Lombardia Trophy, where they own the bronze medal.  Turning to the Grand Prix series, they won silver at the 2018 Grand Prix of Helsinki.  Della Monica commented that "this is our first silver medal on the Grand Prix.  Last year we won our first medal, a bronze, so we are happy that we improved. Next time it maybe will be gold, who knows. It shows that we are on the right track."  They won a second silver medal at the 2018 Rostelecom Cup, becoming the first Italian pair team to qualify for the Grand Prix Final, a goal they had set for themselves at the beginning of the year.  They placed fifth at the Final, after multiple falls and popped jumps.

After winning their fourth consecutive national title, Della Monica/Guarise competed at the 2019 European Championships.  They placed third in the short program, 0.12 points ahead of Aleksandra Boikova / Dmitrii Kozlovskii of Russia, and were awarded a small bronze medal for the result.  In the free skate both teams made errors, with Della Monica putting a hand down on their three-jump combination, and a result finished fourth in the free skate and fourth overall, 0.14 points behind Boikova/Kozlovskii.  Guarise said they were "a little bit disappointed actually, because we gave everything we had. It maybe wasn’t 100 percent, but I think it was very good."

At the 2019 World Championships, Guarise collided with French skater Vanessa James in the warmup for the short program, which shook up both skaters.  He then doubled his jump attempt, causing them to place eighth in the short.  In the free skate the team had multiple errors, finishing seventh there, and eighth overall.  Guarise reported that the aftereffects of the collision had been more of a problem than he initially believed.  Della Monica/Guarise concluded the season at the 2019 World Team Trophy as part of Team Italy, which finished sixth out of sixth teams.

2019–20 season
Della Monica dislocated her shoulder during the summer, delaying the team's training significantly.  They returned to competition at the 2019 Icelab International in Italy, taking the silver medal, a week before their first Grand Prix.  At the 2019 Cup of China, they placed fourth.  At the 2019 NHK Trophy, Della Monica/Guarise placed eighth.

After winning the Italian title again, Della Monica/Guarise competed at the 2020 European Championships, placing fourth. They had been assigned to compete at the World Championships in Montreal, but these were cancelled as a result of the coronavirus pandemic.

2020–21 season
Della Monica/Guarise were scheduled to compete on the Grand Prix at the 2020 Internationaux de France, but the event was cancelled due to the pandemic. They placed eighth at the 2021 World Championships in Stockholm. Finishing the season at the 2021 World Team Trophy, they placed second in the short program and fourth in the free skate, while Team Italy finished in fourth place overall.

2021–22 season
Della Monica/Guarise began the season on home soil at the Lombardia Trophy, where they won the gold medal. They were initially assigned to the 2021 Cup of China as their first Grand Prix of the season, but following the event's cancellation they were reassigned to a special home 2021 Gran Premio d'Italia, hosted in Turin. They placed third in the free skate despite both falling on their side-by-side jumps, but were fourth in the free skate with several errors and dropped to fourth place overall. Guarise acknowledged " today was hard physically and mentally," which he said did not reflect their training. They were seventh at the 2021 Rostelecom Cup. Della Monica said afterward that she intended to retire at the end of the season to start a family, while Guarise expressed a desire to continue, joking "maybe she can be my coach one day."

After winning the gold medal at the Italian championships again, Della Monica/Guarise were named to the Italian Olympic team and withdrew from the 2022 European Championships as a precautionary measure after a fall in training.

Della Monica/Guarise began the 2022 Winter Olympics as the Italian entries in the pairs' short program of the Olympic team event, where they placed seventh of nine teams, earning four points for Team Italy. Team Italy did not advance to the second stage of the competition and finished seventh. In the pairs event, they placed tenth in the short program after Della Monica fell on her jump attempt. In the free skate they dropped to thirteenth.

On 19 April 2022, Della Monica announced her retirement from competitive figure skating.

Programs

With Guarise

With Kocon

Singles career

Competitive highlights 
GP: Grand Prix; CS: Challenger Series; JGP: Junior Grand Prix

Pairs with Guarise

Pairs with Kocon

Singles career

References

External links 

 
 
 

Italian female pair skaters
Italian female single skaters
1989 births
Living people
Sportspeople from the Province of Bergamo
Figure skaters at the 2010 Winter Olympics
Figure skaters at the 2014 Winter Olympics
Figure skaters at the 2018 Winter Olympics
Figure skaters at the 2022 Winter Olympics
Olympic figure skaters of Italy
Universiade medalists in figure skating
Universiade bronze medalists for Italy
Competitors at the 2013 Winter Universiade